This is a list of player transfers involving Top 14 teams before or during the 2019–20 season. The list is of deals that are confirmed and are either from or to a rugby union team in the Top 14 during the 2018–19 season. It is not unknown for confirmed deals to be cancelled at a later date. Bayonne and Brive are promoted to the Top 14, whilst Grenoble and Perpignan are demoted to the Pro D2 for the 2019–20 season.

Agen

Players in
 Malino Vanai from  Montauban
 Walter Desmaison from  Mont-de-Marsan
 Laurence Pearce from  Mont-de-Marsan
 Xavier Chauveau from  Racing 92
 Raphaël Lagarde from  Racing 92
 Dylan Hayes from  Angoulême
 Clement Martinez from  Biarritz
 Jamie-Jerry Taulagi from  Mont-de-Marsan
 Pierce Phillips from  Worcester Warriors
 Julien Jane from  Bayonne
 Nathan Decron from  Bordeaux
 Jordan Puletua from  Beziers
 Joel Sclavi from  Angoulême short-term contract
 Anton Peikrishvili from  Aia Kutaishi (short-term loan)

Players out
 Antoine Miquel to  Toulouse
 Quentin Bethune to  Stade Francais
 Facundo Bosch to  La Rochelle
 Clement Laporte to  Lyon
 Denis Marchois to  Pau
 Julien Hériteau to  Toulon
 Jake McIntyre to  Clermont
 Fouad Yaha to  Catalans Dragons
 Yohan Montes to  Provence
 Xerom Civil to  Carcassonne
 Yoan Tanga-Mangene to  Racing 92 (short-term deal)
 Tamaz Mchedlidze to  Rouen
 Christaan van der Merwe to  Carcassonne
 Opeti Fonua to  Layrac
 Ricky Januarie to  Chateauroux
 Nicolas Metge to  Narbonne
 Joel Sclavi to  Jaguares

Bayonne

Players in
 Hansie Graaff from  Massy
 Alofa Alofa from  Harlequins
 Andres Gorin from  Massy
 Brandon Fajardo from  Colomiers
 Jean-Baptiste de Clercq from  Oloron
 Jean Monribot from  Toulon
 Edwin Maka from  Racing 92
 Mariano Galarza from  Bordeaux
 Viliamu Afatia from  Bordeaux
 Census Johnston from  Racing 92
 Mat Luamanu from  Harlequins
 Malietoa Hingano from  Stade Francais
 Djibril Camara from  Stade Francais
 Michael Ruru from  Melbourne Rebels
 Callum Wilson from  Angoulême

Players out
 Bandisa Ndlovu to  Sharks
 Juan Pablo Orlandi retired
 Tristian Tedder to  Toulouse
 Julien Jane to  Agen
 Alexandre Gouaux to  Aurillac
 Kyle Whyte to  London Scottish
 Benjamin Thiery retired
 Gregory Arganese retired
 Maxime Marty to  Toulouse
 Bastien Fuster to  Rouen
 Willie du Plessis to  Biarritz

Bordeaux

Players in
 Remi Lamerat from  Clermont
 Ben Botica from  Oyonnax
 Yoram Moefana from  Colomiers
 Maxime Lucu from  Biarritz
 Santiago Cordero from  Exeter Chiefs
 Scott Higginbotham from  Queensland Reds
 Alexandre Flanquart from  Stade Francais
 Masalosalo Tutaia from  Perpignan (short-term loan)

Players out
 Luke Jones to  Melbourne Rebels
 Baptiste Serin to  Toulon
 Irakli Tskhadadze to  Brive
 Romain Lonca to  Biarritz
 Leroy Houston to  Biarritz
 Greg Peterson to  Newcastle Falcons
 Mariano Galarza to  Bayonne
 Nathan Decron to  Agen
 George Tilsley to  Perpignan
 Lucas Lebraud to  Biarritz
 Viliamu Afatia to  Bayonne
 Brock James to  La Rochelle

Brive

Players in
 Mesake Doge from  Timișoara Saracens
 Kitione Kamikamica from  Vannes
 Hayden Thompson-Stringer from  Saracens
 Setareki Bituniyata from  Massy
 Vano Karkadze from  Aurillac
 Julien Blanc from  Pau
 Quentin Delord from  Lyon
 Alex Dunbar from  Glasgow Warriors
 Mitch Lees from  Exeter Chiefs
 Nico Lee from  Cheetahs

Players out
 Petrus Hauman retired
 Demba Bamba to  Lyon
 Vivien Devisme to  Lyon
 Luka Goginava to  Angoulême
 Felix Le Bourhis to  Carcassonne
 Dominiko Waqaniburotu to  Pau
 Samuel Marques to  Pau
 Ken Bikadua to  Surenes
 Damien Lagrange to  Provence
 Loick Jammes to  Provence
 Benjamin Petre to  Albi
 Peceli Nacebe to  Fijian Drua
 Arnaud Mignardi released

Castres

Players in
 Hans N'Kinsi from  Grenoble
 Thomas Fortunel from  Montauban
 Filipo Nakosi from  Toulon
 Bastien Bourgier from  Toulouse
 Karena Wihongi from  Carcassonne
 Matt Tierney from  Pau
 Benjamin Lapeyre from  Beziers (short-term loan)

Players out
 Thibault Lassalle to  Oyonnax      
 Yannick Caballero retired
 Yohan Le Bourhis to  Oyonnax  
 Scott Spedding retired
 Yohan Domenech to  Rouen
 David Smith to  Narbonne
 Steve Mafi to  London Irish

Clermont

Players in
 George Merrick from  Harlequins
 Jake McIntyre from  Agen
 Mike Tadjer from  Grenoble
 Rudy Paige from  Cheetahs (short-term loan)
 JJ Engelbrecht from  Stormers (short-term loan)
 Faifili Levave from  Mitusbishi DynaBoars (short-term loan)
 Duane Aholelei from  Tasman (short-term loan)

Players out
 Remi Lamerat to  Bordeaux
 Michaël Simutoga to  Grenoble
 Patricio Fernandez to  Lyon
 Dorian Laverhne to  Provence
 Damien Chouly to  Perpignan
 Flip van der Merwe retired
 Corentin Astier to  Montauban
 Benjamin Kayser retired
 William Hutteau to  Vannes

La Rochelle

Players in
 Reda Wardi from  Beziers
 Facundo Bosch from  Agen
 Brock James from  Bordeaux
 Teddy Stanaway from  Oyonnax (short-term deal)

Players out
 Hikairo Forbes to  Provence
 William Demotte to  Grenoble
 Steeve Barry to  Biarritz
 Benjamin Noble to  Angoulême
 Mohamed Boughanmi to  Pau
 Ryan Lamb retired
 Eric Marks to  Vannes

Lyon

Players in
 Demba Bamba from  Brive
 Vivien Devisme from  Brive
 Tanginoa Halaifonua from  Massy
 Clement Laporte from  Agen
 Xavier Chiocci from  Toulon
 Kilian Geraci from  Grenoble
 Patricio Fernandez from  Clermont
 Badri Alkhazashvili from  Provence
 Josua Tuisova from  Toulon

Players out
 Lionel Beauxis to  Oyonnax
 Manuel Carizza retired
 Delon Armitage retired
 Deon Fourie to  Grenoble
 Virgile Lacombe retired
 Albertus Buckle retired
 Adrien Seguret to  Mont-de-Marsan
 Quentin Delord to  Brive

Montpellier

Players in
 Guilhem Guirado from  Toulon
 Anthony Bouthier from  Vannes
 Handre Pollard from  Bulls
 Kahn Fotuali'i from  Bath
 Caleb Timu from  Queensland Reds
 Lucas de Connick from  Biarritz
 Lizo Gqoboka from  Bulls (short-term loan)

Players out
 Yvan Watremez to  Biarritz
 Romain Ruffenach to  Biarritz
 Alexandre Dumoulin to  Pau
 Julien Tomas retired
 Yannick Arrboyo to  Beziers
 Chris Kuridrani to  Kagifa Samoa
 Ruan Pienaar to  Cheetahs

Pau

Players in
 Denis Marchois from  Agen
 Alexandre Dumoulin from  Montpellier
 Ben Smith from  Highlanders
 Siegfried Fisi'ihoi from  Stade Francais
 Luke Whitelock from  Highlanders
 Lucas Pointud from  Toulouse
 Dominiko Waqaniburotu from  Brive
 Samuel Marques from  Brive
 Mohamed Boughanmi from  La Rochelle

Players out
 Thomas Domingo retired
 Julien Blanc to  Brive
 Sean Dougall to  Valence Romans
 Matt Tierney to  Castres
 Peter Saili to  Valence Romans
 Laurent Bouchet to  Grenoble
 Steffon Armitage to  San Diego Legion

Racing 92

Players in
 Ali Oz from  Grenoble
 Kevin Le Guen from  Angoulême
 Dorian Laborde from  Mont-de-Marsan
 François Trinh-Duc from  Toulon
 Yoan Tanga-Mangene from  Agen (short-term loan)
 Theo Velten from  Angoulême
 Sam Hidalgo-Clyne from  Scarlets (short-term deal)
 Joaquín Díaz Bonilla from  Jaguares (short-term loan)

Players out
 Xavier Chauveau to  Agen
 Raphaël Lagarde to  Agen
 Pat Lambie retired
 Ole Avei to  Angoulême
 Edwin Maka to  Bayonne
 Dimitri Szarzewski retired
 Census Johnston to  Bayonne
 Joe Rokocoko retired

Stade Français

Players in
 Christopher Vaotoa from  Montauban
 Quentin Bethune from  Agen
 Pablo Matera from  Jaguares
 Pierre-Henri Azagoh from  Massy
 Sami Mavinga from  Newcastle Falcons
 James Hall from  Oyonnax
 Sefa Naivalu from  Queensland Reds
 Thierry Feuteu from  Alcobendas Rugby
 Fabien Witz from  Massy
 Joris Segonds from  Aurllac
 Loic Godener from  Grenoble
 Quentin James from  Perpignan
 Ruan Combrinck from  Lions
 Lionel Mapoe from  Lions (short-term loan)
 Tolu Latu from  NSW Waratahs
 Damien Fitzpatrick from  Waratahs (short-term loan)
 Carlü Sadie from  Western Province (short-term loan)
 Joketani Koroi from  Otago
 Luke Tagi from  Fijian Drua (short-term loan)

Players out
 Siegfried Fisi'ihoi to  Pau
 Piet van Zyl retired
 Alexandre Flanquart to  Bordeaux
 Tony Ensor to  Oyonnax
 Morné Steyn to  Bulls
 Laurent Sempere retired
 Sylvain Nicolas retired
 Malietoa Hingano to  Bayonne
 Djibril Camara to  Bayonne
 Sergio Parisse to  Toulon
 Denis Coulson to  Carcassonne
 Elies El Ansari to  Massy
 Jimmy Yobo to  Aurillac

Toulon

Players in
 Christopher Tolofua from  Saracens
 Baptiste Serin from  Bordeaux
 Eben Etzebeth from  Stormers
 Nehe Milner-Skudder from  Hurricanes
 Duncan Paia'aua from  Queensland Reds
 Julien Hériteau from  Agen
 Bryce Heem from  Worcester Warriors
 Thomas Hoarau from  Beziers
 Theo Dachary from  Biarritz
 Masivesi Dakuwaqa from  Western Force
 Gabin Villiere from  Rouen
 Gervais Cordin from  Grenoble
 Beka Gigashvili from  Grenoble
 Sergio Parisse from  Stade Francais
 Ben Te'o from  Worcester Warriors (short-term deal)
 Wilco Louw from  Stormers (short-term loan)
 Louis Schreuder from  Sharks
 Sonatane Takulua from  Newcastle Falcons
 Ramiro Moyano from  Jaguares

Players out
 Guilhem Guirado to  Montpellier
 Xavier Chiocci to  Lyon
 Eric Escande to  Grenoble
 Malakai Fekitoa to  Wasps
 François Trinh-Duc to  Racing 92
 Jean Monribot to  Bayonne
 Josua Tuisova to  Lyon
 Filipo Nakosi to  Castres
 Mathieu Bastareaud to  Rugby United New York
 Darly Domvo to  Biarritz
 JP Pietersen to  Sharks
 Rudy Gahetau to  Rouen
 Jonah Placid to  Western Force
 Juandré Kruger to  Bulls

Toulouse

Players in
 Tristian Tedder from  Bayonne
 Bastien Chalureau from  Nevers
 Rory Arnold from  Brumbies
 Maxime Marty from  Bayonne
 Werner Kok from  South Africa Sevens (short-term loan)
 Takeshi Hino from  Yamaha Jubilo (short-term loan)
 Jaco Visagie from  Bulls (short-term loan)

Players out
 Pierre Gayraud to  Grenoble
 Piula Fa'asalele to  Perpignan
 Lucas Pointud to  Pau
 Alexandre Manukula to  Colomiers
 Bastien Bourgier to  Castres
 Maks van Dyk to  Harlequins

See also
List of 2019–20 Premiership Rugby transfers
List of 2019–20 Pro14 transfers
List of 2019–20 Super Rugby transfers
List of 2019–20 RFU Championship transfers
List of 2019–20 Major League Rugby transfers

References

2018-19
2019–20 Top 14 season